Séamus Murphy may refer to:

 Seamus Murphy (1907–75) Irish sculptor
 Séamus Murphy (Gaelic footballer) (born 1938) Kerry player
 Séamus Murphy (Wexford hurler) (born 1950s) player and coach
 Séamus Murphy (Carlow hurler) (born 1986)
 Seamus Murphy, Irish filmmaker

See also
 James Murphy (disambiguation) anglicised spelling
 Seamus McMurphy (1720–50) Irish poet and outlaw